Kempson is a surname. Notable people with the surname include:

Darran Kempson (born 1984), English professional footballer
Edwin Kempson (1862–1931), the second Suffragan Bishop of Warrington
F. R. Kempson (1838–1923), English architect
James Kempson (1742–1822), English choirmaster
 Julie Hart Beers Kempson (1835–1913), American painter better known as Julie Hart Beers
Lily Kempson (1897–1996), Irish trade union activist and rebel
Matthews Kempson (1831–1894), English educationalist and cricketer
Rachel Kempson (1910–2003), English actress
Ruth Kempson (born 1944), British linguist
Sibyl Kempson (born 1973), American playwright, and performer
William Kempson (1835–1877), English soldier and cricketer

See also
Empson
Kempston
Kempstone